John Vesey  was an 18th-century Anglican priest in Ireland.

The son of John Vesey, Archbishop of Tuam,  and his second wife Anne  Muschamp, he was educated at Trinity College, Dublin and Christ Church, Oxford. Vesey was Rector of Ballinrobe. In 1706 he was appointed Prebendary of Kilmoylan at Tuam Cathedral. Vesey was Archdeacon of Kilfenora from 1714 to 1743.

References

Deans of Kilfenora
Archdeacons of Kilfenora
18th-century Irish Anglican priests
Alumni of Trinity College Dublin
Alumni of Christ Church, Oxford